Union Hall may refer to:

Australia
 Union Hall (Adelaide), a hall and theatre in Adelaide, South Australia

Ireland
 Union Hall, County Cork, a village in Ireland

United States
 Union Hall (Danforth, Maine), listed on the National Register of Historic Places (NRHP)
 Union Hall (Searsport, Maine), NRHP-listed
 Union Hall (Truro, Massachusetts), NRHP-listed
 Union Hall (Chaumont, New York), NRHP-listed
 Union Hall (North Salem, New York), NRHP-listed
 Union Hall, Virginia, in Franklin County, Virginia

See also
Trades hall

Architectural disambiguation pages